The Nguni people are a Bantu ethnic group from South Africa, with off-shoots in neighbouring countries in Southern Africa. Swazi (or Swati) people live in both South Africa and Eswatini, while Northern Ndebele people live in both South Africa (as immigrants) and Zimbabwe.

A group of the Nguni living in present day Malawi and Zambia originated from South Africa and are known as AbaNgoni (or Ngoni/Nguni). The name AbaNgoni can be translated to "People who don't commit sins", or abeNguni known to be displaced by warfare and are refugees or sojourners. They would, thanks to the goodwill of the Nguni chiefs, integrate into neighbouring tribes as refugees, or join forces to defeat rival tribes. Both the Ndebele of Zimbabwe and the Ngoni migrated northwards out of South Africa in the early 19th century, during a politically tumultuous era that included the Mfecane and Great Trek.

In South Africa, the historic Nguni kingdoms of the Ndebele, Swazi, Xhosa and Zulu are in the present-day provinces of Southern and Eastern Cape, Gauteng, KwaZulu-Natal, Limpopo and Mpumalanga. The most notable of these kingdoms are the Zulu Kingdom, which was ruled by Shaka, a warrior king whose conquest took place in the early nineteenth century, and the Xhosa Kingdom, a paramouncy that had multiple states as tributaries and would become notorious for the wars they fought against European settlers, which lasted for a period of 100 years. In Zimbabwe the Ndebele people live primarily in the provinces of Matabeleland.

History

Most of what is believed about ancient Nguni history comes from oral history and legends. Traditionally, their partial ancestors are said to have migrated to Africa's Great Lakes region from the north. According to linguistic evidence and historians (including John H. Robertson, Rebecca Bradley, T. Russel, Fabio Silva and James Steele), what would be some of the ancestors of the Nguni people migrated from west of the geographic centre of Africa towards modern-day South Africa 7000 years ago (5000 BC). Nguni ancestors had migrated within South Africa to KwaZulu-Natal by the 1st century AD, and were also present in the Transvaal region at the same time. These partially nomadic ancestors of modern Nguni people brought with them sheep, cattle, goats and horticultural crops, many of which had never been used in South Africa at that time.

Other provinces in present-day South Africa, such as the Cape, saw the emergence of Nguni speakers at around the same time. Some groups split off and settled along the way, while others kept going. Thus, the following settlement pattern formed: the southern Ndebele in the north, the Swazi in the northeast, the Xhosa in the south and Zulu towards the east. Because these peoples had a common origin, their languages and cultures show marked similarities.  Partial ancestors of the Nguni eventually met and merged with San hunters, which accounts for the use of click consonants in the languages of Nguni.

Many tribes and clans in KwaZulu-Natal are said to have been forcibly united under Shaka Zulu. Shaka Zulu's political organisation was efficient in integrating conquered tribes, partly by the age regiments, where men from different villages bonded with each other.

Many versions in the historiography of southern Africa state that during the South African upheaval known as Mfecane, the Nguni peoples spread across a large part of southern Africa, absorbing, conquering or displacing many other peoples. However, the notion of the mfecane/difaqane has been disputed by some scholars, notably Julian Cobbing. The Mfecane was initiated by Zwide and his Ndwandwes. They attacked the Hlubi and stole their cattle, leaving them destitute. The remnants of the Hlubi under their chief Matiwane fled into what is now the Free State and attacked the Batlokwa in the Harrismith Vrede area. This displaced the Batlokwa under Mmanthatisi, and she and her people spread conflict further into the central interior. Moshoeshoe and his Bakwena sought the protection of Shaka and sent him tribute in return. When Matiwane settled at Mabolela, near present-day Clocolan, Moshoeshoe complained to Shaka that this prevented him from sending his tribute whereupon an impi was sent to drive Matiwane from this area. Matiwane fled south and raided one of the Xhosa kingdoms, which got his whole tribe annihilated by Paramount Hintsa, at the Battle Of Mbholompo. Mmanthatisi and her Batlokwa settled near what is now Ficksburg and was followed by her son, Sekonyela, as chief of the Batlokwa. It was he who had stolen Zulu cattle that Piet Retief in his dealings with Dingane, Shaka's successor, retrieved. After the defeat of Zwide and his Ndwandwes by Shaka, two of his commanders, Soshangane and Zwengendaba, fled with their followers northwards, engaging in conflict as they went. Soshangane eventually founded the Shangane nation in Mozambique and Zwengendaba moved all the way to what is now Tanzania. Mzilikazi in his flight from Shaka depopulated the eastern highveld and northern Free State, killing the men and capturing the women to form his Matabele nation. Initially, he settled near what is now Pretoria, then moved to Mosega, near present day Zeerust, but after his defeat by the Voortrekkers he moved to present-day Zimbabwe where he founded his capital Bulawayo.

Social organisation
Within the Nguni nations, the clan, based on male ancestry, formed the highest social unit. Each clan was led by a chieftain. Influential men tried to achieve independence by creating their own clan. The power of a chieftain often depended on how well he could hold his clan together. From about 1800, the rise of the Zulu clan of the Nguni, and the consequent Mfecane that accompanied the expansion of the Zulus under Shaka, helped to drive a process of an alliance between and consolidation among many of the smaller clans.

For example, the kingdom of [Eswatini] was formed in the early nineteenth century by different Nguni groups allying with the Dlamini clan against the threat of external attack. Today, the kingdom encompasses many different clans who speak a Nguni language called Swati and are loyal to the king of Eswatini, who is also the head of the Dlamini clan. 

"Dlamini" is a very common clan name among all documented Nguni languages (including Swati and Phuthi), associated with AbaMbo cultural identity.

Religion
Ngunis may be Christians (Catholics or Protestants), practitioners of African traditional religions or members of forms of Christianity modified with traditional African values.They also follow a mix of these two religions, most of the time not separately.

Constituent peoples
The following peoples are considered Nguni:

Notes

Ngoni people by ethnicity are found in Malawi (under Paramount Chief Mbelwa and Maseko Paramouncy), Zambia (under Paramount Chief Mpezeni), Mozambique and Tanzania. In Malawi and Zambia, they speak a mixture of languages of the people they conquered, such as Chewa, Nsenga and Tumbuka.

References

External links